For the district in Indonesia see: Sekayu, Indonesia

Sekayu is a small village in Terengganu, Malaysia.

References

Villages in Terengganu